Epichoristodes adustana is a species of moth of the family Tortricidae. It is found in KwaZulu-Natal, South Africa.

References

Archipini
Endemic moths of South Africa
Moths described in 1881
Taxa named by Thomas de Grey, 6th Baron Walsingham